Destiny Turns on the Radio is a 1995 American comedy film directed by Jack Baran. The film starred Dylan McDermott, Nancy Travis, Quentin Tarantino, James LeGros and James Belushi. It marked the film debut role of David Cross, and was the first film produced by Rysher Entertainment.

Plot
An incarcerated bank robber, Julian Goddard, escapes from prison. He is rescued in the desert by Johnny Destiny, a bizarre, possibly supernatural character. Destiny takes Julian to Las Vegas and the Marilyn Motel, owned by Harry Thoreau, who was Julian's partner in crime. Julian searches for his girlfriend, Lucille, and the proceeds of the heist.

However, Destiny has taken the money and Lucille is pregnant and shacking up with Tuerto, a mob kingpin. Her agent has convinced a record label to send a talent scout to hear her lounge singing act, but Julian's arrival upsets her plans. As they are hunted by both the police and Tuerto's henchmen, Destiny toys with their fate.

Cast
Dylan McDermott as Julian Goddard
Nancy Travis as Lucille
James LeGros as Harry Thoreau
Quentin Tarantino as Johnny Destiny
James Belushi as Tuerto
Janet Carroll as Escabel
David Cross as Ralph Dellaposa
Richard Edson as Gage
Bobcat Goldthwait as Mr. Smith
Barry Shabaka Henley as Dravec
Lisa Jane Persky as Katrina
Sarah Trigger as Francine
Tracey Walter as Pappy
Allen Garfield as Vinnie Vidivici

Reception
Roger Ebert gave the film 1 star out of 4 and wrote that it "moves at a lugubrious pace, is neither funny nor satirical, does not create any interest in its characters and takes seriously just those parts it should be laughing at - the Tarantino character, for example, or the business of how Lucille got pregnant in a dream. It's one of those movies where everybody must have spent a lot of time convincing themselves that the material would work if you looked at it in the right way, but nobody ever knew exactly what the right way was." Janet Maslin of The New York Times stated, "Thoroughly upstaged by the Las Vegas setting and by a studiously garish production design, the actors play out a satirically dark story laced with broad, dopey humor. If you don't think the idea of Bobcat Goldthwait in black socks is funny, you won't laugh at much else." Todd McCarthy of Variety called the film "a hopeless and hapless attempt at cool. Apparently aiming at some sort of fable about winning and losing in American culture, filmmakers flail about trying to establish a tone that never materializes, and an array of good actors is left with nothing coherent to play." Gene Siskel of the Chicago Tribune awarded 1 star out of 4 and called the film "A major disappointment considering the presence of 'Pulp Fiction' director Quentin Tarantino as one of the co-stars of a road picture that leads to Las Vegas. Maybe it proves just what a tremendous achievement 'Pulp' was, because these riff-raff types are deadly dull." Lisa Schwarzbaum of Entertainment Weekly assigned a grade of D+ and wrote, "The visual cues that signify retro hipness — wraparound sunglasses, red convertibles, gaudy Las Vegas — take the place of true style in this self-satisfied riff on pulp-fiction themes." Peter Rainer of the Los Angeles Times called the film "a metaphysical snore fest that manages to strand an entire platoon of attractive performers in an oasis of pseudo-hip pseudo-cool."

As of March 2022, the film holds a 16% rating on Rotten Tomatoes, based on 19 reviews.

Home video
The film was released on VHS and LaserDisc by HBO Home Video, but is out of print. It has not been released on DVD or Blu-ray, but it is available to rent or buy digitally from Paramount Pictures.

References

External links

1995 films
American comedy films
Films about bank robbery
Rysher Entertainment films
Savoy Pictures films
1990s English-language films
1990s American films